The Angereb also known as the Bahr as-Salam is a river of Ethiopia and eastern Sudan, and one of the sources of the Nile. It rises near Daqwa, north of Gondar in the Amhara Region, flowing west to join the Atbarah River. The historic district of Armachiho is located along part of its course.

The Angereb dam, commissioned in 1997, was intended to reduce the town's potable water supply problem for 25 years. The Angereb reservoir and two boreholes are the main sources of water for the town and have a combined average production capacity of 8,298 m3/day.

See also 
 Lesser Angereb
 List of rivers of Ethiopia
 List of rivers of Sudan

References 

Atbarah River
Rivers of Ethiopia
Rivers of Sudan
International rivers of Africa